Samuel Robertson (1 May 1843 - 18 June 1862) was a private in the United States Army who was awarded the Medal of Honor for gallantry during the American Civil War. Robertson was the first American soldier posthumously awarded the Medal of Honor; he was awarded the medal in September 1863 for actions performed behind Confederate lines near Big Shanty, Georgia in April 1862.

Personal life 
Robertson was born in Muskingum County, Ohio on 1 May 1843. He was hanged as an enemy spy in Atlanta, Georgia on 18 June 1862.

Military service 

Robertson enlisted in the Army on 1 September 1861 at Bourneville, Ohio and was mustered into the 33rd Ohio Infantry. On 12 April 1862, a group of 22 men including Robertson from the 2nd, 21st, and 33rd Ohio Infantry, who had penetrated more than 200 miles into Confederate territory, successfully raided a train in Big Shanty, Georgia. This action was later known interchangeably as the Mitchell Raid (after General Ormsby M. Mitchell), the Andrew's Raid, and the Great Locomotive Chase.

Robertson was eventually captured and sentenced to death by hanging, and was executed for espionage on 18 June 1862.

Robertson's Medal of Honor citation reads:

Robertson's medal is attributed to Ohio.

References 

Great Locomotive Chase
People executed by the Confederate States of America by hanging